Gesine Bullock-Prado (born March 6, 1970) is an American pastry chef, TV personality, author, attorney, and former film executive.

Life and career
Bullock-Prado was born in Washington, D.C. Her father, John Wilson Bullock (1925–2018), was a United States Army employee and voice coach; her German mother, Helga Mathilde Meyer (1942–2000), was an opera singer who sang at the Staatstheater Nürnberg and the Salzburg Festival and taught voice at the Mary Washington College. Bullock attended the University of Virginia and Southwestern Law School, and became a licensed attorney in 1997.

She joined the production company Fortis Films in 1995 with her sister, actress Sandra Bullock. As the company's lawyer and president, Bullock-Prado co-produced the films Gun Shy and Miss Congeniality 2: Armed and Fabulous, and helped develop dozens of others, including Practical Magic, Miss Congeniality, and the series The George Lopez Show.

She left the film industry in 2004 and relocated to Vermont. From 2005 to 2008, she owned a bakery, Gesine Confectionary, in Montpelier; she is now a pastry instructor at her own baking school in Hartford, Vermont, Sugar Glider Kitchen, and at King Arthur Flour Company.

She is the host of Food Network's Baked in Vermont and appears as a judge on Beat Bobby Flay, Christmas Cookie Challenge, and Worst Cooks.

She is the author of books, including the memoirs Confections of a Closet Master Baker (2009) aka My Life from Scratch (2010) – dedicated to her mother, and the cookbooks Sugar Baby (2011), Pie It Forward (2012), Bake It Like You Mean It (2013), Let Them Eat Cake (2016), and Fantastical Cakes (2018).

She has been married to storyboard artist Raymond Prado since April 3, 1999.

References

External links 
Official blog

"From film-making to cake-baking" by Melissa McClements, The Guardian, 19 March 2011

1970 births
Living people
American bakers
American chefs
American people of German descent
Writers from Washington, D.C.
Southwestern Law School alumni
University of Virginia alumni
Writers from Virginia
American memoirists
American women memoirists
American women lawyers
American cookbook writers
Women food writers
American food writers
Women cookbook writers
American women chefs
21st-century American women